Athens Township is a township in Jewell County, Kansas, USA.  As of the 2000 census, its population was 74.

Geography
Athens Township covers an area of 39.47 square miles (102.24 square kilometers). The streams of Ash Creek, Middle Limestone Creek and West Limestone Creek run through this township.

Adjacent townships
 Ionia Township (north)
 Calvin Township (northeast)
 Browns Creek Township (east)
 Glen Elder Township, Mitchell County (south)
 Cawker Township, Mitchell County (southwest)
 Erving Township (west)
 Odessa Township (northwest)

Cemeteries
The township contains one cemetery, Athens.

Major highways
 K-128

Airports and landing strips
 Rose Port Airport

References
 U.S. Board on Geographic Names (GNIS)
 United States Census Bureau cartographic boundary files

External links
 City-Data.com

Townships in Jewell County, Kansas
Townships in Kansas